Greater Altoona Career and Technology Center  is a vocational school that serves the area around Blair County, Pennsylvania.

Career and Technology Center 
The Greater Altoona Career and Technology Center is a large five-story school building at 1500 Fourth Avenue, Altoona, Pennsylvania 16602.

Associate districts and schools

 Altoona Area School District  
 Bellwood-Antis School District

External links
 

Vocational education in the United States
Buildings and structures in Altoona, Pennsylvania
Schools in Blair County, Pennsylvania
Universities and colleges accredited by the Council on Occupational Education